Fano is a town in central Italy.

Fano may also refer to:

Places
 Fanø, an island of Denmark
 Fano, Gijón, a district in Asturias, Spain
 Fanò, the Italian name of the Ionian Island Othonoi

People with the surname
 Gino Fano (1871–1952), Italian mathematician
 Guido Alberto Fano (1875–1961), Italian pianist and composer
 Johan Fano (born 1978), Peruvian footballer
 Michel Fano (born 1929), French serialist composer
 Robert Fano (1917–2016), Italian-American computer scientist
 Ugo Fano (1912–2001), Italian-American physicist

Other uses
 Fano (militia), an Amhara youth group in Ethiopia, perceived as either a protest movement or an armed militia
 Fano Guitars, an American guitar builder
 Fano plane, a finite projective plane of order 2
 Fano variety, an algebraic variety
 Battle of Fano, a battle in 271 between the Roman Empire and the Juthungi near the Italian city

See also
 Fanno (disambiguation)